Mobberley is a civil parish in Cheshire East, England. It contains 43 buildings that are recorded in the National Heritage List for England as designated listed buildings. Of these, one is listed at Grade I, the highest grade, three are listed at Grade II*, the middle grade, and the others are at Grade II. Other than the village of Mobberley, and part of the runways of Manchester Airport, the parish is rural. The listed buildings are what would be expected in such an area, namely country houses and associated structures, farmhouses and farm buildings, smaller houses and cottages, and a church with associated structures.

Key

Buildings

See also

Listed buildings in Ashley
Listed buildings in Chorley
Listed buildings in Great Warford
Listed buildings in Knutsford
Listed buildings in Marthall
Listed buildings in Ringway, Manchester
Listed buildings in Tatton
Listed buildings in Wilmslow

References
Citations

Sources

 

Listed buildings in the Borough of Cheshire East
Lists of listed buildings in Cheshire